This article displays the rosters for the participating teams at the 2016 FIBA Africa Club Championship for Women.

A Politécnica

Étoile Filante

FAP Yaoundé

Ferroviário de Maputo

First Bank

GS Pétroliers

Interclube

Kenya Ports Authority

Primeiro de Agosto

USIU Flames

See also
 2015 FIBA Africa Championship for Women squads

References

External links
 2015 FIBA Africa Champions Cup Participating Teams

FIBA Africa Women's Clubs Champions Cup squads
Basketball teams in Africa
FIBA
FIBA